Victor Crăsescu (October 16, 1849–1918) was an Imperial Russian-born Romanian prose writer.

Born in Kishinev (Chișinău), capital of the Russian Empire's Bessarabia Governorate, he studied at the local theological seminary until 1872, and then at Odessa University. He later graduated from the medical faculty of Bucharest University. Crăsescu took part in anarchist and narodnik circles inspired by Mikhail Bakunin. In response, he was exiled to Switzerland in 1872, and then traveled to the United States. After returning to Russia, Crăsescu was among the founders of a narodnik circle in his native city. Arrested in 1879, he disappeared, probably during the judicial inquiry, settling in the Romanian Old Kingdom. He was among the founding members of the Prutul Society, as was Nicolae Zubcu-Codreanu. As a writer, he entered the group surrounding Contemporanul magazine, where his first published work appeared; this was the 1883 sketch Legea lui Lynch. He sometimes used the pen name Ștefan Băssărăbeanu. In 1891, he became director of Amicul copiilor, rising to editor in his final year there, 1895. He contributed to the socialist press (Drepturile omului, Dezrobirea and Lumea nouă), as well as to Revista nouă and Viața literară. His sketches and short stories appeared in four volumes during 1893 as Schițe și nuvele; the novel Ovreiul followed in 1899. Realist in style, Crăsescu's work is characteristic of the prose found in Contemporanul. He died in Slănic. His son was the writer Sergiu Cujbă.

Notes

1849 births
1918 deaths
Fugitives wanted by Russia
Emigrants from the Russian Empire to Romania
Writers from Chișinău
People from Kishinyovsky Uyezd
Narodniks
Russian exiles
Romanian magazine editors
Romanian novelists
Romanian male short story writers
Romanian short story writers
Romanian anarchists
Romanian socialists
University of Bucharest alumni